Mark Thomas Lawrenson (born 2 June 1957) is a former professional footballer who played as a defender for Liverpool, among others, during the 1970s and 1980s. After a short career as a manager, he then became a radio, television and internet pundit for the BBC, TV3, BT Sport and Today FM, retiring at the end of the 2021–22 football season. Born and raised in England, Lawrenson qualified to play for the Republic of Ireland through his grandfather, Thomas Crotty, who was born in Waterford.

Club career

Preston and Brighton
Mark Lawrenson was born in Preston and attended St Teresa's Catholic Primary School in Penwortham and, later, Preston Catholic College, a Jesuit school. His father, Tom, had been a winger for Preston North End. He always wanted to be a footballer, although his mother, Theresa, wanted him to become a priest. He began his career, as a 17-year-old, with his hometown club, Preston North End in 1974 who were then managed by World Cup winner Bobby Charlton. Lawrenson was voted Preston's Player of the Year for the 1976–77 season.

After 73 league appearances for the Deepdale club he moved to Alan Mullery's Brighton & Hove Albion in the summer before the start of the 1977–78 season for £100,000. Ironically, they outbid Liverpool who also showed interest in the 19-year-old Lawrenson. Lawrenson made his Brighton debut on 20 August 1977 in a 1–1 draw against Southampton at The Dell. He settled in at the Goldstone Ground and made 40 league appearances by the end of his first season of the club. He went on to make 152 league appearances by the end of the 1980–81 season. However the club entered a financial crisis in 1981 and Lawrenson was forced to leave the club to make funds available. A number of clubs were interested in signing Lawrenson after his resilient performances for both Preston and Brighton, but it was Liverpool manager Bob Paisley who secured his signature.

Liverpool
Liverpool offered a club transfer record of £900,000, and Lawrenson joined in the summer of 1981. He was to form a formidable central defensive partnership with Alan Hansen after Phil Thompson suffered an injury. He was also used occasionally at left-back. He made his first start for the team at left-back in a 1–0 league defeat at the hands of Wolverhampton Wanderers at Molineux on 29 August 1981. He scored his first goal a month later during the 7–0 European Cup 1st round 2nd leg trouncing of Finnish team Oulun Palloseura at Anfield on 30 September. Lawrenson came on for Ray Kennedy in the 64th minute scoring in the 72nd. Also coming off the bench to score his first goal for the club was Ian Rush.

In Lawrenson's first full season, 1981–82, Liverpool won the League championship and the League Cup, defeating Tottenham Hotspur in the final. The team retained both titles for the next two seasons (in the League Cup finals defeating Manchester United in 1983 and Everton in 1984), becoming the third club in history to win three league titles in a row. They also added the club's fourth European Cup in 1984, the last time Liverpool would win Europe's most prestigious club prize until 2005. Lawrenson dislocated his shoulder three weeks before the 1985 European Cup final, the Heysel Stadium Disaster. He started the game, which Liverpool lost 1–0 to Juventus, but was injured after a few minutes and had to be substituted.

Lawrenson earned a reputation as an accomplished player and in the 1985–1986 season he was an integral part of the Liverpool side who completed the third league championship and FA Cup double of the 20th century. They overtook derby rivals Everton to win the league by two points and later came from behind to defeat Everton 3–1 in the 1986 FA Cup final at Wembley. After 1986, Lawrenson's first team place came under threat from the younger Gary Gillespie. Lawrenson's partnership with team captain Hansen continued for one more season before he, already out through a minor injury, suffered Achilles tendon damage in 1988 which prematurely ended his career. He earned a fifth and final title medal when that season ended. His Liverpool career ended after 332 appearances and 18 goals in all competitions – one of which was the fifth goal in a 5–0 defeat of Merseyside rivals Everton on 6 November 1982, a game in which Ian Rush scored four of the five goals.

In 1989, Lawrenson spent one season with the Florida side Tampa Bay Rowdies in the American Soccer League.

Later career
After his time at Liverpool, he was appointed Oxford United manager in 1988. His time at the club was frustrating and he resigned after star striker Dean Saunders was sold by the board of directors without Lawrenson's approval. Over that winter, he made a brief playing comeback in the Football Conference, making two appearances for Barnet. Lawrenson also managed Peterborough United from 6 September 1989 until 9 November 1990.

Lawrenson returned to playing with non-league clubs Corby Town and Chesham United. His final season as a player was as part of the Chesham team that won the 1992-93 Isthmian League. The club was not promoted to the then Football Conference as this would have required ground improvements that could not be afforded, so he decided the time was right to retire from playing completely.

International career
After Preston coach (and former Irish international goalkeeper) Alan Kelly became aware of the young player's Irish connections (and informed Irish international manager Johnny Giles), Lawrenson's solid performances earned him a call-up to the Republic of Ireland national team. He won the first of 39 international caps at the age of 19, in a friendly with Poland on 24 April 1977 at Dalymount Park; the game ended 0–0. Ireland employed Lawrenson's versatility and burgeoning talent by playing him at fullback, in midfield, and occasionally in his favoured position at centre half.

Lawrenson played his first competitive match on 12 October 1977 against Bulgaria in a 1978 World Cup qualifier. This match also ended 0–0, at Lansdowne Road (now Aviva Stadium). Lawrenson scored his first of his five goals for Ireland against Cyprus in Nicosia on 26 March 1980 in a 1982 World Cup Qualifier. He scored his second goal for Ireland in the next competitive match as Ireland beat Netherlands 2–1 at Lansdowne Road in the same qualification campaign. This was also notable as it was Eoin Hand's first match as manager of Ireland. In between these two matches Mark Lawrenson renewed his Preston acquaintance with Alan Kelly Snr as Kelly managed Ireland in a caretaker capacity for a friendly against Switzerland.

Lawrenson scored two goals in Ireland's record victory – an 8–0 thrashing of Malta in a 1984 European Championship qualifier but the Irish goal that he is best remembered for is one against Scotland. It was Jack Charlton's first qualification campaign as Irish manager and Ireland were playing Scotland in Hampden Park in a 1988 Euro qualifier. A sixth-minute goal earned Ireland a precious away victory that went a very long way to helping Ireland to qualify for its first ever major football championship finals. Unfortunately for Lawrenson injury prevented him from making the Irish Euro 1988 squad for the finals.

Lawrenson played his last match for the Republic of Ireland against Israel on 10 November 1987. It was a friendly match at Dalymount Park and was also notable because David Kelly scored a hat trick on his international debut.

Media career
After retiring from international football Lawrenson wrote for the Irish Times, initially providing analysis for the 1990 World Cup. Lawrenson began his television career providing match analysis on HTV West's local football coverage, before working as a pundit for the BBC but then left briefly to become a coach specialising in defensive tactics for Kevin Keegan at Newcastle United. However, the position was again short-lived and he returned to media work. He has since become established as a pundit, both on BBC television and radio, often finding himself sitting alongside his former defensive partner, Alan Hansen. Since the departure from the BBC of Trevor Brooking, he has been the main co-commentator on major national and international (FIFA) matches covered by the television network. He appears regularly on Football Focus and Match of the Day.

He is also often a co-commentator on BBC Radio Five Live, often working on the feature matches on Sunday afternoons. He previously worked as a pundit for Ireland's TV3 between 2001–2007 for mid-week Champions League games alongside Welsh national (FA) team manager and former Liverpool striker, John Toshack. When the Champions League returned to TV3 in 2010 he no longer provided punditry. He was replaced in that role by Tony Cascarino and Martin Keown, and moved into the commentary box alongside TV3 commentator Trevor Welch. He works for Irish radio station Today FM on Premiership Live with presenter Michael McMullan in talking about football related topics, predicting scores and stating facts. He also had a column on the BBC website where he gives his views and predictions on the Premier League's weekend fixtures. Lawrenson is one of a number of ex-Liverpool players who made up the BBC pundit team.

He also writes a regular Preston North End column for the University of Central Lancashire's Students' Union newspaper, Pluto, and a weekly column for the Liverpool Daily Post. He worked with Japanese entertainment company Konami, recording commentary samples for the Pro Evolution Soccer series, alongside ITV commentator Jon Champion, from Pro Evolution Soccer 2008 to Pro Evolution Soccer 2010. He was replaced by ITV pundit Jim Beglin for Pro Evolution Soccer 2011. In addition, Lawrenson has also featured alongside John Motson as a commentator in EA Sports' FIFA series from 99 through 2001 and on the Euro 2000 video game. 

In 2002, Lawrenson made a bet on Football Focus that Bolton would be relegated from the Premiership in the 2001–02 season. He lost the bet after Sam Allardyce's team stayed up, and shaved off his moustache as a result.

At the 2014 FIFA World Cup, the BBC received 172 complaints after Lawrenson said that Swiss striker Josip Drmić "should put a skirt on". The channel responded by stating "We acknowledge that the remark by commentator Mark Lawrenson about Switzerland's Josip Drmić was inappropriate and we apologise for any offence caused by it".

Personal life
In 2003, Lawrenson was awarded an Honorary Fellowship from Myerscough College near Preston for his achievements in football.

In 2018, he was given the all-clear after having a cancerous growth removed from his face. He was made aware of the seriousness of the growth when a concerned viewer contacted the editor of Football Focus. Lawrenson later met the viewer, Dr Alan Brennan, on television.

Honours
Liverpool
Football League First Division (5): 1981–82, 1982–83, 1983–84, 1985–86, 1987–88
FA Cup: 1985–86
League Cup: 1981–82, 1982–83, 1983–84
FA Charity Shield: 1982, 1986
Football League Super Cup: 1986
European Cup: 1983–84

Statistics

Club

International

International goals

Managerial statistics

Notes

See also
 List of Republic of Ireland international footballers born outside the Republic of Ireland

References

External links
Past players profile at LiverpoolFC.tv
Player profile at LFC history.net
Mark Lawrenson at Sporting Heroes.net

1957 births
Living people
American Soccer League (1988–89) players
English association football commentators
English footballers
Footballers from Preston, Lancashire
Republic of Ireland association footballers
Republic of Ireland international footballers
Preston North End F.C. players
Brighton & Hove Albion F.C. players
Liverpool F.C. players
Barnet F.C. players
English Football League players
National League (English football) players
English Football Hall of Fame inductees
Republic of Ireland football managers
Tampa Bay Rowdies (1975–1993) players
Oxford United F.C. managers
Peterborough United F.C. managers
Newcastle United F.C. non-playing staff
People from Penwortham
English people of Irish descent
BBC sports presenters and reporters
Chesham United F.C. players
Association football defenders
Expatriate soccer players in the United States
English expatriate sportspeople in the United States
English expatriate footballers
FA Cup Final players